Eugène Leterrier (1843 – 22 December 1884 in Paris) was a French librettist.

Leterrier worked at the Hôtel de Ville in Paris but then turned to the theatre. He mainly collaborated in writing libretti with Albert Vanloo. Their working relationship was productive and stress-free.

In collaboration with Vanloo success first came with Giroflé-Girofla and La petite mariée for Lecocq. The pair went on to provide libretti for Potier, Jacob, de Villebichet, Offenbach, Chabrier, Lacome and Messager. Chabrier was particularly pleased with the honest and hard work he enjoyed with the librettists for his first staged works.

List of libretti
With Albert Vanloo
Giroflé-Girofla (1874)
La petite mariée for Lecocq (1875)
Le voyage dans la lune (1875)
La Marjolaine for Lecocq (1877)
L'étoile (1877)
La Camargo for Lecocq (1878)
Une éducation manquée (1879)
La jolie Persane for Lecocq (1879)
Le jour et la nuit for Lecocq (1881)
Mam'zelle Moucheron for Offenbach (1881)
Le droit d'aînesse (1883)
La Béarnaise (1885)

With Albert Vanloo and Arnold Mortier
L'arbre de Noël for Lecocq (1880)

References

External links
List of works by Leterrier at the Index to Opera and Ballet Sources Online

French opera librettists
1843 births
1884 deaths
French male dramatists and playwrights
19th-century French dramatists and playwrights
19th-century French male writers